Prom King, 2010 is a 2017 LGBT coming-of-age drama film written and directed by Christopher Schaap, in his directorial debut. It stars Schaap with Adam Lee Brown and Nicole Wood.

Plot 
The film tells the story of a gay college student, Charlie, a lovable but naive young man trying to navigate the New York City dating scene with its endless online encounters, strange chats and cute freshman boys. He loves classic movies and yearns to meet "the one" in a kind of old-fashioned Hollywood fantasy. But he also wants a real connection with someone, not just dating apps and casual sex. Still hurting from his first relationship with a Mormon boy in high school, Charlie first falls for a guy who's already in a relationship and just wants sex, and then for a closeted freshman who soon decides he's not ready to come out. He also falls for his best friend, who loves him but just wants to stay friends. Eventually he begins to fear that his sexuality is actually preventing him from finding the love of his life.

Cast 
 Christopher Schaap as Charlie
 Julia Weldon as Jules
 Adam Lee Brown as Thomas
 Laura Dowling Shea as Aunt Val
 Frans Dam as Ford
 Matthew Brown as Ben
 Nicole Wood as Grace
 Richard Brundage as Dad
 Tyler Austin as Aaron
 Mark Lee as Finley
 Aaron Luis Profumo as Hank
 Rosanne Rubino as Mom

Release

Film Festivals 
 3 March 2017, Cinequest Film Festival
 25 April 2017, OUTshine Film Festival, Miami
 26 May 2017, Seattle International Film Festival
 31 May 2017, Inside Out Toronto LGBT Film Festival
 9 June 2017, Tel Aviv International LGBT Film Festival
 19 June 2017, Frameline Film Festival
 9 July 2017, Outfest Los Angeles LGBT Film Festival

Awards

References

External links
 Official Trailer on Vimeo
 Prom King, 2010 on IMDb

American LGBT-related films
American independent films
2017 LGBT-related films
LGBT-related coming-of-age films
Proms in fiction
2010s English-language films
2010s American films